The Nandi Award for Best Female Playback Singer was commissioned since 1977: As of now K S Chithra and S Janaki  won 11 & 10 awards respectively, followed by P. Susheela with 6 wins.

Winners

See also

 List of music awards honoring women

References

Female Playback Singer
Music awards honoring women